Horace Holley may refer to:

 Horace Holley (minister) (1781–1827), Unitarian minister and president of Transylvania University
 Horace Holley (Baháʼí) (1887–1960), follower of the Bahá'í Faith